9 Locust Place is a historic house located at the address of the same name in Sea Cliff, Nassau County, New York.

Description and history 
It was built in 1890, and is a large, three-story residence with a prominent cross-gable roof designed in the Queen Anne style. A porch and tower were added to the home in 1978; a kitchen extension was added in 2015. Also on the property is a two-bay brick garage built in 1918.

It was listed on the National Register of Historic Places on February 18, 1988.

References

Houses on the National Register of Historic Places in New York (state)
Queen Anne architecture in New York (state)
Houses completed in 1880
Houses in Nassau County, New York
National Register of Historic Places in Nassau County, New York